Uropterygius xenodontus is a moray eel found in coral reefs in the Pacific Ocean. It is commonly known as the black snake moray, strange-toothed snake moray, or the wedge-tooth snake moray.

References

xenodontus
Fish described in 1997